John Beauchamp (fl. 1334–1348) was an English politician.

John Beauchamp may well be the same person as the New Shoreham MP, John de Beauchamp who served around the same time (1331–32 and 1336).

He was a Member (MP) of the Parliament of England for New Shoreham in 1334, 1335–36, 1337–38, 1340, 1341, 1344 and 1348.

References

Year of birth missing
Year of death missing
English MPs 1334
English MPs 1335–36
English MPs 1337–38
English MPs 1340
English MPs 1341
English MPs 1344
English MPs 1348